A meteorite is an object that originates in outer space and impacts the surface of a planet or moon.

Meteorite may also refer to:
Meteorite Hills, a group of hills, forming the western portion of the Darwin Mountains in Antarctica
Meteorite Island, an island in Baffin Bay, in Avannaata municipality, off northwest Greenland
HMS Meteorite, an experimental U-boat developed in Germany, scuttled at the end of World War II, subsequently raised and commissioned into the Royal Navy
Meteorites (wasp), a genus of wasps in the tribe Euphorini

Music
Meteorites (album), by Echo & the Bunnymen
"Meteorite" (Mariah Carey song), 2014
"Meteorite" (Years & Years song), 2016

Other
Rolls-Royce Meteorite, also known as the Rover Meteorite, a V8 petrol or diesel engine derived from the Rolls-Royce Meteor
A monk from the monasteries of Meteora may be called a Meteorite